The  St. John Ambulance Association and Brigade of Sri Lanka (also often referred to as the St. John Ambulance of Sri Lanka) is a charitable organisation providing healthcare services to the Sri Lankan public. Its members also perform voluntary first aid coverage duties during national events. 
The headquarters is located at 65/11, Sir Chittampalam A. Gardiner Mawatha, Colombo 02.

History
St John Ambulance was established in Ceylon in 1906. The National St. John Council was formed in 1967 to govern St. John's activities in Sri Lanka. St. John Sri Lanka has some 50,000 volunteers.

Former Chief Commanders
 Dr. Sarath Samarage, Dr.Palitha Abeykoon, Dr. D.W.Weerasuriya, Dr.J.G.Jayatilake, Brig.Dr.H.I.K.Fernando, G.A.Piyadasa

Activities
First aid training
Disaster preparedness
Relief work
Occupational health & safety
First aid in schools
Public duties - festivals, cricket tests
Community based nutrition projects

Cadet Movement
St John Ambulance in Sri Lanka largely consists of cadet members - i.e. secondary school students who joined St John as their Co-curricular activity. Currently, various schools are as follows:

 Colombo

Royal College, Colombo
Gothami Balika Vidyalaya, Colombo 10
Colombo Hindu College
Prince of Wales' College, Moratuwa
St. Anthony's College, Kandy
St. Benedict's College
 Nuwara Eliya
Poramadulla Central College
 Galle
Mahinda College

Awards and Commendations
Officers and Members of the Brigade are eligible for the following Awards and Commendations:

Local Awards
5 Years First Aid Efficiency Medal (for 5 years' service)
Commendation Medal (which carries the post-nominal letters CMSJ)

International (Order) Awards
Service Medal of the Order of St John (for 10 years' service)
Bar to the Service Medal (for each subsequent 5 years' service up to 45 years)
Gilt Laurel Leaf (for 50 years' service)
Admission to the Venerable Order of Saint John
 Serving Brother / Serving Sister (SBStJ or SSStJ)
 Officer Brother / Officer Sister (OStJ)
 Commander Brother / Commander Sister (CStJ)
 Knight / Dame of Grace (KStJ or DStJ), note that this does not entitle the holder to Sir 

The grades of the Order are numbered 1 through 6, however, this is not to be confused with the grading of Brigade Officers.

The highest grade in the Order, GCStJ is limited only to the Great Officers of the Order and 21 other individuals. The lowest grade in the Order, Esq StJ is for Personal Esquires for KStJ and above who probably play a role similar to that of an Aide-de-Camp.

Alliances
 - Royal County of Berkshire
 - St. John Australia

See also
Order of St. John
St John Ambulance Ranks and Insignia
Insignia of the Venerable Order of St John
St. Andrew's Ambulance Association

References

External links
Order of the Hospital of St. John of Jerusalem
Order of St. John, Sri Lanka
www.stjohnsrilanka.org Official website of St. John ambulance Sri Lanka

Youth organisations based in Sri Lanka
Sri Lanka
Ambulance services in Sri Lanka